Uncancylus is a genus of small, freshwater, air-breathing limpets, aquatic pulmonate gastropod molluscs in the family Planorbidae, the ram's horn snails and their allies.

Anatomy 
These animals have a pallial lung, as do all pulmonate snails, but they also have a false gill or "pseudobranch" which can serve perfectly well as a gill when they are unable to reach the surface for air.

Species 
Species within the genus Uncancylus include:

 Uncancylus concentricus (d'Orbigny, 1835)
 Uncancylus crequi (Bavay, 1904)
 Uncancylus foncki (Philippi, 1866)
 Uncancylus patagonicus  (Biese, 1948)

References

Planorbidae